Wilhelmina Petronella Ardina Maria ("Mijntje") Donners (born February 4, 1974 in Den Bosch, North Brabant) is a field hockey striker from the Netherlands, who played 234 international matches for the Dutch National Women's Team, in which she scored 97 goals.

External links
 
 Dutch Hockey Federation
 Website with more information

1974 births
Field hockey players at the 1996 Summer Olympics
Field hockey players at the 2000 Summer Olympics
Field hockey players at the 2004 Summer Olympics
Dutch female field hockey players
Living people
Olympic field hockey players of the Netherlands
Olympic bronze medalists for the Netherlands
Olympic silver medalists for the Netherlands
Sportspeople from 's-Hertogenbosch
Olympic medalists in field hockey
Medalists at the 1996 Summer Olympics
Medalists at the 2000 Summer Olympics
Medalists at the 2004 Summer Olympics
HC Den Bosch players
20th-century Dutch women
21st-century Dutch women